Here Come the Huggetts is a 1948 British comedy film, the first of the Huggetts series, about a working class English family. All three films in the series were directed by Ken Annakin and released by Gainsborough Pictures.

Jack Warner and Kathleen Harrison head the cast as factory worker Joe Huggett and his wife Ethel, with Petula Clark, Jane Hylton and Susan Shaw as their young daughters (all with the same first names as the actresses portraying them) and Amy Veness as their opinionated grandmother. Diana Dors had an early role.

Joe and Ethel had been introduced a year earlier in the film Holiday Camp and there would be two sequels, Vote for Huggett and The Huggetts Abroad (both 1949).

Plot
Factory worker Joe Huggett has a first-time telephone installed at home, for work purposes, but his daughters quickly find a lot more use for it. Diana, a flighty cousin of Ethel's (played by a 16-year-old Diana Dors), arrives for a not-very-welcome visit and causes problems at home and at Joe's workplace when Ethel persuades Joe to get her a job there. Eldest daughter Jane must choose between her fiancé who has been away in the forces and a new local admirer. Meanwhile, the family is planning to go to London to see the royal wedding, and Grandma Huggett joins them in camping out overnight near Buckingham Palace.

Clark, who began her career as a child vocalist on BBC Radio, sings the song "Walking Backwards".

Cast
 Jack Warner as Joe Huggett
 Kathleen Harrison as Ethel Huggett
 Jane Hylton as Jane Huggett
 Susan Shaw as Susan Huggett
 Petula Clark as Pet Huggett
 Jimmy Hanley as Jimmy Gardner
 David Tomlinson as Harold Hinchley
 Diana Dors as Diana Hopkins
 Peter Hammond as Peter Hawtrey
 John Blythe as Gowan
 Amy Veness as Grandma Huggett
 Clive Morton as Mr. Campbell
 Maurice Denham as 1st Engineer
 Doris Hare as Mrs. Fisher
 Esma Cannon as Youth Leader
 Alison Leggatt as Miss Perks
 Dandy Nichols as	Aunt Edie Hopkins
 Hal Osmond as 2nd Engineer
  Peter Scott as Office Boy
  Keith Shepherd as Vicar
 Edmundo Ros as himself (as Edmundo Ros and His Rhumba Band)

Production
Filming took place in June 1948. The working title was Wedding Bells.

Film reviewer Stephen Vagg described the film as a breakthrough role for Diana Dors, who played Ma Huggett's niece.

References

External links

Here Come the Huggetts at BFI
Review of film at Variety

1948 films
Gainsborough Pictures films
Films directed by Ken Annakin
British black-and-white films
Films with screenplays by Muriel Box
Films with screenplays by Sydney Box
Films produced by Betty Box
Films scored by Antony Hopkins
Films with screenplays by Peter Rogers
Islington Studios films
British comedy films
1948 comedy films
The Huggetts (film series)
1940s British films